Hesperian Health Guides, formerly known as Hesperian Foundation, is a nongovernmental non-profit organization publishing health guides for trained and untrained people to care for themselves and others. The foundation is based in Berkeley, California. Among their best-selling publications is Where There is No Doctor, first published in 1973 and updated every few years. The book has been translated to more than 80 languages and the World Health Organization estimates that it may be the most widely used public health manual in the world.

Hesperian's publications are known for their simplicity of expression and illustrations, both intended to make them suitable for use by ordinary people in home and community contexts. Where There is No Doctor was praised by those who felt it "demystified and politicized health care," communicating that "although some health problems require expert medical attention, there is much that we can do on our own to positively affect our health," a message also communicated in subsequent works. As of 2011, the organization had a rating of four out of four stars from Charity Navigator for the efficient use of donated funds.

Collaborations
Hesperian often works with other organizations to create new publications and revise older ones. The short work Water for Life: Community Water Security was published in conjunction with the United Nations Development Program. In 2006, Hesperian received a US$40,000 grant from the Rockefeller Brothers Fund to develop a book on environmental health, and in 2004 the Firelight Foundation provided a small grant to fund the revision of the 1999 book HIV, Health, and Your Community.

Complementing its other activities, the organization includes a gratis fund that sends free copies of its publications to those who cannot afford them, a translation fund providing seed grants to cover the costs of local translation and adaptation in international communities, and a grant fund to assist health education programs in developing creative ways to use Hesperian publications by such means as street theater and radio broadcasts. Access to the publications also is fostered through the organization's policy of permitting copying, reproduction or adaptation of any part of a publication to meet local needs "provided the parts reproduced are distributed free or at cost—not for profit," resulting in the availability of online copies of various publications.

Hesperian Health Guides is an official supporting organization of Healthcare Information For All by 2015.

Reviews
Hesperian Health Guides "is responsible for countless miracles in various parts of the world by providing basic health care books to those who either cannot afford medical treatment or cannot survive the long, arduous journey to the nearest doctor," says the San Francisco Chronicle.

Hesperian's publications are widely praised by a variety of sources, and Hesperian involves organizations from all over the world in the development of its books. "Where There Is No Doctor is an indispensable resource... This book has been, quite literally, a lifesaver for the poor - even where there is a doctor." says Paul Farmer, Professor of Social Medicine, Harvard Medical School.
"Helping Children Who are Deaf" was praised in The Journal of Deaf Studies and Deaf Education for its "broad perspective. Parents, teachers, deaf adults, and health care workers from around the world—over 17 countries—advised and reviewed draft materials of the book. A very long and impressive list of individuals and organizations from Bangladesh to Zimbabwe are given credit and thanks for sharing their experiences, stories, and knowledge." Another review criticized the book as not sufficiently overcoming Western cultural assumptions about areas such as privacy.

Selected publications 
Hesperian released Health Actions for Women in February 2015; a 352-page print book and online resource that shares proven strategies and activities to help women and men facilitate community discussions and action around such topics as family planning, sexuality, HIV, and gender-based violence — even in challenging settings where education and organizing for women's and girls’ health may be difficult or dangerous.

In May 2015 Hesperian also released "Workers' Guide to Health and Safety" to put occupational safety and health information into a form that can be used by those most affected by workplace hazards—the workers themselves. From low wages to sexual harassment, from ergonomics to fire safety, from chemical exposure at work to pollution outside the plant, this book draws on the experiences of factory workers and their communities around the world to provide actionable tools to help organize for short- and long-term improvements. Developed in collaboration with factory workers and their advocates, workers, educators, and organizers will find a wealth of practical and sustainable information in this one-of-a-kind resource.

English
Where there is no doctor
Where women have no doctor
Where there is no dentist
A book for midwives
HIV, health and your community
Disabled village children: A guide for community health workers, rehabilitation workers, and families
Helping children who are blind: Family and community support for children with vision problems
Helping children who are deaf: Family and community support for children who do not hear well
A health handbook for women with disabilities
Water for life: Community water security
Helping health workers learn
Sanitation and cleanliness for a healthy environment
Pesticides are poison

Other languages
Most of the titles listed above are available from Hesperian in Spanish, and a few are available from the Foundation in French, Vietnamese, and Chinese. Publications are distributed by a variety of other organizations in over 100 other languages, including:

 Albanian
 Amharic
 Arabic
 Aymara
 Azeri
 Bengali
 Bicol
 Burmese
 Cebuano
 Chichewa
 Chitimbuka
 Haitian Creole
 Croatian
 Dari (Persian)
 Persian
 Fiji
 Fulfulde
 Georgian
 German
 Gujarati
 Hausa
 Hiligaynon
 Hindi
 Iban
 
 Ibatan
 Igbo
 Ilocano
 Ilongo
 Indonesian
 Italian
 Japanese
 Jinghpaw
 Kannada
 Karakalpak
 Karen
 Kazakh
 Khmer
 Kinyarwanda
 Kirundi
 Kiswahili
 Korean
 Kwangali
 Kyrgyz
 Lao
 Luganda
 Luo
 Macedonian
 Malagasy
 
 Malayalam
 Malaysian
 Maranao
 Marathi
 Marshallese
 Miskito
 Mongolian
 Mortlockese
 Naga
 Nahua
 Nepali
 Oriya
 Oshivambo
 Pashto
 Persian
 Portuguese
 Pulas
 Quechua
 Russian
 Sepedi
 Serbian
 Sgawkaren
 Shan
 Shuar
 
 Sindhi
 Sinhala
 Somali
 Sotho
 Swahili
 Tagalog
 Tamil
 Telugu
 Tetum
 Thai
 Tibetan
 Tigrinya
 Tsonga
 Tswana
 Turkish
 Tzotzil
 Ukhrul
 Urdu
 Uzbek
 Venda
 Wolof
 Xhosa
 Yoruba
 Zulu

Notes

External links

Medical and health foundations in the United States
Publishing companies of the United States